Sir William Williams may refer to:

Sir William Williams, 1st Baronet, of Vaynol (died )
Sir William Williams, 1st Baronet, of Tregullow (1791-1870), see Williams family of Caerhays and Burncoose
Sir William Williams, 1st Baronet, of Gray's Inn (1634-1700), Welsh lawyer and politician, speaker of the House of Commons
Sir William Williams, 1st Baronet, of Kars (1800–1883), British military leader of the Victorian era, Member of Parliament for Calne (1856–1859)
Sir William Williams, 2nd Baronet, of Clapton (–1761) Member of Parliament for New Shoreham (1758–1761)
Sir William Williams, 2nd Baronet, of Gray's Inn (–1740), Welsh politician, Member of Parliament for Denbigh (1708–1710)
Sir William Emrys Williams (1896–1977), British educationalist and Editor-in-Chief of Penguin Books, 1936–1965
Sir Thomas Williams (Warrington MP) (1915–1986), British Labour Co-operative politician, Member of Parliament for Hammersmith South, Barons Court and Warrington (1949–1981)

See also
Williams baronets
William Williams (disambiguation)
Sir William Williams, 1st Baronet (disambiguation)